Rubén Olivares Avila (born January 14, 1947) is a Mexican former professional boxer and a member of the International Boxing Hall of Fame., Olivares was a world champion multiple times, and considered by many as the greatest bantamweight champion of all time. He was very popular among Mexicans, many of whom considered him to be Mexico's greatest fighter for a long period. He currently holds the record for the most wins in unified title bouts in bantamweight history, at 6. Olivares has also had both starring and cameo appearances in Mexican movies, and he participated in more than 100 professional bouts.

Professional career
Olivares made his pro debut at the age of 17 by knocking out Freddy García in round one at Cuernavaca. With that knockout win, a streak of 22 knockout wins in a row had been set off. During that streak, he beat Tony Gallegos, Monito Aguilar and Antonio Leal, among others. It was on March 8, 1967, that Felipe González became the first one to go the distance with Olivares, when Olivares defeated him by a decision in 10 at Mexicali. Then, on July 29 of that same year, Olivares had the first spot on his record, Germán Bastidas holding him to a ten-round draw.

He had back to back rematches with González and Bastidas, knocking González out in round six on November 19, and Bastidas in round four on January 28, 1968. Then came a step up in opponent quality, when he met former world champion Salvatore Burruni in Mexico City. Olivares knocked Burruni out in three rounds. After defeating Manuel Arnal by a disqualification in six, he set off on another knockout win streak, this one reaching 21 in a row. One of the fights in that streak was against Bernabé Fernández, in Los Angeles. Olivares won his first fight abroad that day, beating Fernández in round three. On May 23, 1969, he defeated Olympic gold medalist Takao Sakurai.

World Bantamweight Championship
After accumulating a record of 51-0-1, Olivares received his first world title bout when he faced world bantamweight champion Lionel Rose, who was defending his world title that day, at the Inglewood Forum. According to boxing book The Ring: Boxing In The 20th Century, the forum's director, fearing a riot like the one that happened after Rose had beaten Chucho Castillo there might happen again, went to Olivares' locker room to express his worries, and Olivares guaranteed he wouldn't let that happen again. Olivares became the world bantamweight champion by knocking Rose out in round five on that day, August 22 of 1969.

After beating Alan Rudkin in a title defense and a couple other fighters in non-title bouts, Olivares started his trilogy of bouts with arch-enemy and countryman Castillo. Olivares' knockout streak ended in that fight, but he won the first installment of the Olivares-Castillo rivalry after rising off the canvas to score a 15-round decision. After three more non-title wins, Olivares and Castillo met again, on October 16 of 1970. This time, Olivares suffered a cut in round one, and the fight was stopped in round 14, Castillo the winner and new world Bantamweight champion by a technical knockout. This was Olivares' first loss in his 62 fight career.

After one more win, Olivares and Castillo had their rubber match, on April 3 of 1971. Olivares was knocked down once, but he rose to regain the world Featherweight title in the last fight between him and Castillo with another 15-round decision. Then, he had six more knockouts in a row, including one in a non-title bout in Nicaragua, one in Nagoya, Japan while defending the crown in the rematch for a fight which took place in 1969, won by Olivares by TKO in the 2nd round. The rematch against Kazuyoshi Kanazawa was a brutal affair and in the 13th round Kanazawa seemed to be on the verge of stopping Olivares, having him pinned to the ropes and a corner. It appears Kanazawa emptied his "tank" with this last attack and before the round ended Kanazawa could hardly keep his feet, and fell clumsily after missing with an uppercut. Olivares floored Kanazawa three times in the 14th round, prompting the stoppage victory. This fight was voted as the best Japanese match of 1971. Another victory came against former champion Efren Torres, and one against Jesus Pimentel, also in round 11.

On March 19, 1972, Olivares lost the world's Bantamweight title to another countryman, Rafael Herrera, by a knockout in round eight. After defeating Godfrey Stevens in Monterrey, he and Herrera met again, with Herrera the winner by a 10-round decision.

Move to Featherweight
Next for Olivares was a move up in division, and he started to campaign in the Featherweight division by defeating Walter Seeley. On June 23 of 1973, he met future champion Bobby Chacón in the first installment of another trilogy of fights. What was contested for the NABF featherweight title, ended in round nine when Olivares knocked Chacón out. In his next fight, the 78th of his career, he suffered an upset, when unknown Art Hafey knocked him out in five rounds, but then he set off on a string of three more wins in a row, including a decision over Hafey in a rematch, before fighting for the WBA's vacant world Featherweight championship.

WBA Featherweight Championship
On July 9, 1974, Olivares became world Featherweight champion by beating Zenzuke Utagawa by a knockout in round seven. After two non-title wins, he met Alexis Argüello on November 23 of that year, losing the world title by a knockout in round 13. He was winning this fight before he gassed and was eventually stopped.

WBC Featherweight Championship
One more win, and Olivares met Chacón in the second installment of their trilogy,  this time with Chacón as the WBC's world Featherweight champion. Olivares won the fight by a knockout in round two, to become world champion for the fourth time. This time, however, he also lost the title in his first defense, beaten by Ghana's David "Poison" Kotey, who became that nation's first world boxing champion ever by winning a 15-round decision against Olivares. A seven-round knockout defeat at the hands of future world champion Danny "Little Red" López followed.

Olivares won two fights in 1976 and lost one, including a victory over world title challenger Fernando Cabanela of the Philippines and a loss to another world title challenger, José Cervantes, from Colombia. In 1977, Olivares and Chacón boxed the final bout of their trilogy, and this time Chacón came out the winner, by a 10-round decision. But in 1978, Olivares found what would be the beginning of his last hurrah in his 93rd bout, as he knocked out the future 2 time world Lightweight champion José Luis Ramírez in two rounds at Ciudad Obregón, and he followed that win with wins over Shig Fukuyama and Isaac Vega.

After drawing in ten rounds with Guillermo Morales on April 22, 1979, he received what would turn out to be his last world title try: On July 21 of that year, he was knocked out in 12 rounds by WBA world Featherweight champion Eusebio Pedroza in Houston, for the WBA Featherweight title.

For the next eight years, he fought sporadically and with mixed success, until he was able to walk away from professional boxing in 1988.

Legacy
Until Julio César Chávez came onto the scene, Olivares was considered Mexico's best boxer. He became a mainstream star, and had friends in the Mexican entertainment world. He frequently performed cameos in comic Mexican films. He remains a Mexican national hero.

Olivares' acting career prolonged for 12 films, including Las Glorias del Gran Puas, a 1984 film based on Olivares' life that also starred an all star Mexican cast including Sasha Montenegro, Carmen Salinas, Manuel "Flaco" Ibáñez, Roberto Guzman, Raul Padilla, Sergio Bustamante and Rafael Inclan among others.

He had a record of 89 wins, 13 losses and 3 draws, with 79 wins by knockout. His knockout winning streaks of 22 and 21 in a row qualify as two of the longest knockout winning streaks in the history of boxing. Similarly, his 78 knockout wins make him a member of an exclusive group of boxers to have won 50 or more fights by knockout. In 2003, The Ring placed him at number twelve in their list of the greatest punchers of all time.

Olivares is a member of the International Boxing Hall of Fame.

Olivares was voted as the #1 bantamweight (along with Carlos Zárate) of the 20th century by the Associated Press in 1999.

Professional boxing record

See also
List of WBC world champions
List of WBA world champions
List of featherweight boxing champions
List of bantamweight boxing champions
List of Mexican boxing world champions
List of undisputed world boxing champions

References

External links

International Boxing Hall of Fame Bio

Rubén Olivares - CBZ Profile

|-

|-

|-

|-

|-

|-

|-

|-

Boxers from Mexico City
Featherweight boxers
Bantamweight boxers
International Boxing Hall of Fame inductees
World boxing champions
World bantamweight boxing champions
World featherweight boxing champions
World Boxing Association champions
World Boxing Council champions
Mexican male boxers
1947 births
Living people
Mexican actors